Minnesota State Highway 75 may refer to:
U.S. Route 75 in Minnesota
Minnesota State Highway 75 (1920-1933), a numbered highway in Minnesota